Let Me Be Clear is the debut extended play by Australian alternative band Gang of Youths, released on 29 July 2016 via Mosy Recordings and Sony Music Australia.

The EP features 5 original tracks and a cover of Joni Mitchell's "Both Sides Now".

Let Me Be Clear debuted and peaked at number two on the ARIA Albums Chart and was nominated for Best Rock Album at the 2016 ARIA Music Awards, but lost to Violent Soho's Waco.

Release
Let Me Be Clear was released on CD, LP, and for digital download on 29 July 2016.

Singles
Let Me Be Clear was preceded by one single: "Strange Diseases", released on 16 May 2016.

Chart performance
Let Me Be Clear debuted and peaked at number 2 on the ARIA Albums Chart for the chart dated 8 August 2016, held off from the number one position by Human Nature's Gimme Some Lovin': Jukebox Vol II.

The following week, the album fell 21 positions to number 23, before halving its position in its third week of charting to land at number 46. The album fell to number 76 in its fourth week, before dropping out of the top 100 entirely a week later.

Track listing

Personnel
Adapted from the album's liner notes.

Musicians
Gang of Youths
 David Le'aupepe – composing , vocals 
 Joji Malani – composing , performing 
 Jung Kim – performing 
 Max Dunn – performing 
 Donnie Borzestowski – performing 
 Tom Hobden – performing 

Other musicians
 Adrian Breakspear – clarinet 
 David J. Andrew – piano 
 Jennifer Geering – violin 
 Chris Collins – violin 
 Paul Taylor – cello 
 Patrick Stickles – piano 
 Jonathan Baker –  trumpet 
 Joni Mitchell – composing

Technical
 Gang of Youths – production 
 Karl Cash – production, recording , mixing 
 Chris Collins – production , mixing 
 Adrian Breakspear – recording 
 Kevin McMahon – recording 
 Leon Zervos – mastering

Artwork
 Mclean Stephenson – photography, artwork design

Charts

References

Notes

2016 debut EPs
Gang of Youths EPs
Albums produced by Gang of Youths
Albums produced by Chris Collins (musician)
Sony Music Australia EPs